Koratla railway station (Station Code: KRLA) comes under  Peddapalli–Nizamabad section. It is an Indian Railways station which serves the town Korutla of Jagtial District in Telangana. It is a major station after Lingampet - Jagityal station (LPJL) and Karimnagar railway station (KRMR). It is administered under Secunderabad railway division of South Central Railway zone of Indian Railways.

History 
Koratla railway station comes under Peddapalli–Nizamabad line. On 30 June 1993, P. V. Narasimha Rao has sanctioned Peddapalli–Nizamabad line. After 2 decades i.e., after 23 years, in 2016 the line was inaugurated.

Arrivals and Departures 

Railway stations in Telangana

 Peddapalli–Lingampet Jagityal–Peddapalli DEMU (77258/77257)
 Nizamabad–Karimnagar–Nizamabad MEMU Express Special (07893/07894)
 Dadar Central–Kazipet Junction–Dadar Central Special Fare Special Express (07195/07196)